This is a list of Delaware suffragists, suffrage groups and others associated with the cause of women's suffrage in Delaware.

Groups 

 Arden Equal Suffrage Association, formed in 1912.
Congressional Union (CU).
Delaware Equal Suffrage Association (DESA), formed in 1895.
Delaware Suffrage Association, formed in 1869.
Equal Suffrage Study Club.
New Castle Equal Suffrage Association.
Newport Equal Suffrage Association.
National Women's Party (NWP).
Wilmington Equal Suffrage Club (or Association), formed in 1895.
Wilmington Equal Suffrage Suffrage Study Club (WESSC).
Women's Christian Temperance Union (WCTU) of Delaware.

Suffragists 

 Helen Wormley Anderson .
Annie Arniel (Wilmington).
Rachel Foster Avery (Wilmington).
Anna Cootsman Bach.
Alice Gertrude Baldwin (Wilmington).
Ida Perkins Ball.
Mary Richardson Bancroft.
 Naomi Barrett (Wilmington).
 Catherine Boyle (New Castle).
Mary Clare Brassington.
 Mary E. Brown (Wilmington).
Eleanor Morris Burnet.
Emma Jester Burnett.
 Mary Ann Shadd Cary (Wilmington).
Martha Churchman Cranston.
Mary R. De Vou (Wilmington).
Mabel F. Donahoe.
 Bessie Spence Dorrell.
Agnes Y. Downey (Wilmington).
Rose Lippincott Hizar Duggin.
Josephine Anderson du Pont.
Mary Seward Pillips Eskridge.
Sallie Topkis Ginns (Wilmington).
Susie Estella Palmer Hamilton.
Rosewell Hammond.
 Florence Hilles (New Castle).
Robert G. Houston (Georgetown).
Margaret W. Houston.
Caroline Taylor Hughes.
Ella W. Johnson.
Etta Gray Jones (Bridgeville).
Margaret Harrigon Kent.
Marie T. Lockwood (Middletown).
Emma Maria Lore (Wilmington).
Annie J. Magee (Wilmington).
Mary H. Askew Mather.
Mary E. Marchand Milligan.
Winifred Morris.
Anna Fisher Morse.
 Alice Dunbar Nelson (Wilmington).
Nellie B. Nicholson (Wilmington).
Gertrude Fulton Nields.
Mary Ospina (Wilmington).
Jane White Pennewill.
Mary Price Phillips.
Adelina Piunti (New Castle).
Mabel Lloyd Ridgely (Dover).
Eva Halpern Robin.
Elizabeth G. Robinson.
Willabelle Shurter.
Frank Stephens (Arden).
Mary Ann Sorden Stuart (Greenwood).
 Blanche Williams Stubbs (Wilmington).
 Emma Gibson Sykes (Wilmington).
 Mabel Vernon (Wilmington).
Elizabeth Walling.
Emalea Pusey Warner.
Sadie Monroe Waters (Greenwood).
Anna Beauchamp Reynolds Wedler.
Caroline B. Williams (Wilmington).
Mary J. Johnson Woodlen (Wilmington).
Emma Worrell.

Politicians in support of women's suffrage 

 T. Coleman du Pont.
John G. Townsend, Jr.

Places 

 Hotel DuPont (Wilmington).
New Castle County Courthouse (New Castle).

Suffragists who campaigned in Delaware 

 Lida Stokes Adams.
Lucy E. Anthony.
Susan B. Anthony.
Mary C. C. Bradford.
Carrie Chapman Catt.
Mary Ware Dennett.
Susan S. Fessenden.
Helen Hoy Greeley.
Laura A. Gregg.
Beatrice Forbes Robertson Hale.
Florence Jaffray Harriman.
Mary Garrett Hay.
Elsie Hill.
Diana Hirschler.
Anna Maxwell Jones.
Rosalie Jones.
 Belva Lockwood.
Maria McMahon.
Harriet May Mills.
Henrietta G. Moore.
Emmeline Pankhurst.
Maud Wood Park.
Jeannette Rankin.
Anna Howard Shaw.
Elizabeth Cady Stanton.
Mary Church Terrell.
Lola Trax.
Harriet Taylor Upton.
Narcissa Cox Vanderlip.
Mary Heald Way.
Mary Winsor.

Anti-suffragists 
Groups

 Delaware Association Opposed to Woman Suffrage (DAOWS), formed in 1914.

People
 Elizabeth du Pont Bayard.
Amy du Pont.
Emily Bissell (Wilmington).
May du Pont Saulsbury.
Mary Wilson Thompson (Greenville).
Politicians

 Henry P. Scott.

See also 

 Timeline of women's suffrage in Delaware
 Women's suffrage in Delaware
 Women's suffrage in states of the United States
 Women's suffrage in the United States

References

Sources

External links 
 Letter from Carrie Chapman Catt to Mary R. de Vou
Votes for Delaware Women: A Centennial Exhibition (online exhibition) at Special Collections, University of Delaware Library, Museums and Press

Delaware suffrage

Delaware suffragists
Activists from Delaware
History of Delaware
Suffragists